Burkhan Buudai (divinity mountain) is a mountain of the Gobi-Altai Mountains and located in the Govi-Altai Province in Mongolia. It has elevation of 3,765 metres (12,352 ft).

References 

Mountains of Mongolia
Altai Mountains
Govi-Altai Province